Streptomyces zaomyceticus is a bacterium species from the genus of Streptomyces which has been isolated from soil in Japan. Streptomyces zaomyceticus produces zaomycin, pikromycin, glumamycin and foroxomithine.

See also 
 List of Streptomyces species

References

Further reading

External links
Type strain of Streptomyces zaomyceticus at BacDive – the Bacterial Diversity Metadatabase

zaomyceticus
Bacteria described in 1954